The Ultimate is a compilation of recordings by Grace Jones released in 1993. The album would cover the same material as 1985's Island Life, in addition to four other tracks. The Ultimate was only released in the Netherlands, where it enjoyed considerable success.

Track listing
 "Slave to the Rhythm" – 4:27
 "Nipple to the Bottle" – 5:58
 "My Jamaican Guy" – 6:00
 "Walking in the Rain" – 4:18
 "La Vie en rose" – 7:26
 "The Fashion Show" – 4:05
 "I've Seen That Face Before (Libertango)" – 4:29
 "Do or Die" – 3:23
 "I Need a Man" – 3:23
 "Private Life" – 6:20
 "Love Is the Drug" – 8:42
 "Pull Up to the Bumper" – 4:42
 "Use Me" – 5:05
 "Warm Leatherette" – 5:38

Note: Edits of "Slave to the Rhythm", "Do or Die" and "The Fashion Show" are included.

Charts

References

External links
 The Ultimate on Discogs
 The Ultimate on Rate Your Music

1993 compilation albums
Island Records compilation albums
Grace Jones compilation albums